Fabio Pieters (born 3 June 1978 in Rojas, Buenos Aires) is a former Argentine football midfielder.

Pieters started his professional playing career in 1998 with Lanús, in 2000 he joined Los Andes, he was part of the squad that obtained promotion to the Argentine Primera later that year.

Pieters joined Estudiantes in 2001 after Los Andes' relegation, but after making only 6 appearances for the Estudiantes he returned to Los Andes in 2003. He then had spells with Defensores de Belgrano and Israeli side Hapoel Petah Tikva before joining Gimnasia de Jujuy in 2005.

External links
  Argentine Primera statistics
 Football-Lineups player profile

1978 births
Living people
Sportspeople from Buenos Aires Province
Argentine footballers
Association football midfielders
Club Atlético Lanús footballers
Club Atlético Los Andes footballers
Defensores de Belgrano footballers
Estudiantes de La Plata footballers
Hapoel Petah Tikva F.C. players
Gimnasia y Esgrima de Jujuy footballers
Argentine Primera División players
Argentine expatriate footballers
Expatriate footballers in Israel